Terminal 3 station serves Toronto Pearson International Airport in Mississauga, Ontario, Canada. It is the intermediate stop on the three stop Link Train automated people mover.

The station is an elevated structure serving a single island platform that connects Terminal 3 of the airport with the Sheraton Gateway Hotel. Terminal 3 is served by WestJet, and airlines belonging to the SkyTeam and Oneworld alliances.

Terminal 3 station has connections with Toronto Transit Commission routes; 900 Airport Express bus service to Kipling station (on Line 2 Bloor–Danforth); 52A Lawrence West local service and 952 Lawrence West Express during rush hours to Lawrence station (on Line 1 Yonge–University); 300A, 332 and 352 Blue Night Network buses. It also has a connection with MiWay route 100 Airport Express bus during weekdays only. The bus stop for these routes is located outside the terminal on the arrivals level.

References

External links

Toronto Pearson International Airport
Airport railway stations in Canada
Railway stations in Mississauga
Railway stations in Canada opened in 2006
2006 establishments in Ontario